Dichromanthus aurantiacus is a terrestrial species of orchid. It is native to much of Mexico, Guatemala, Honduras and El Salvador. It is a common and conspicuous weed in fallow fields in much of the region.

References

External links
IOSPE orchid photos, Dichromanthus aurantiacus (Lex.) Salazar & Soto Arenas 2002
University of California Botanical Garden, photo of the day, By Daniel Mosquin on September 10, 2009, Dichromanthus aurantiacus

Spiranthinae
Orchids of Central America
Orchids of Mexico
Flora of Honduras
Flora of Guatemala
Flora of El Salvador
Plants described in 1825